Varablanca is a district of the Heredia canton, in the Heredia province of Costa Rica.

The Vara Blanca head city is located between Poas Volcano and Barva Volcano in Heredia Province in Costa Rica. It is an important cross-road location for all major traffic connecting the northern parts of Costa Rica especially the Sarapiqui River delta area with the major population area of the San Jose Central Valley. On January 8, 2009, it was struck by a powerful 6.1 magnitude earthquake known as the Cinchona earthquake.

History 
Varablanca was created on 5 July 1971 by Decreto 1819-G. Segregated from districts Puerto Viejo and Dulce Nombre de Jesús.

Geography 
Varablanca has an area of  km² and an elevation of  metres.

Demographics 

For the 2011 census, Varablanca had a population of  inhabitants.

Transportation

Road transportation 
The district is covered by the following road routes:
 National Route 120
 National Route 126

References 

Districts of Heredia Province
Populated places in Heredia Province